In the mathematical field of topology, a locally finite space is a topological space in which every point has a finite neighborhood, that is, an open neighborhood consisting of finitely many elements.

A locally finite space is Alexandrov.

A T1 space is locally finite if and only if it is discrete.

References

General topology
Properties of topological spaces